The Socialist People's Party (Norwegian: Sosialistisk Folkeparti) was a splinter group of the Norwegian Labour Party (DNA) founded in 1961. SF was principally dissatisfied with the pro-NATO/European Economic Community external policies of DNA. A group centered on the magazine Orientering had been expelled from DNA. The party merged into the Socialist Left Party in 1976.

History
In the mid-1960s the youth organization of SF, Socialist Youth League (Sosialistisk Ungdomsfylking), started moving towards revolutionary Marxism, leading to a split in 1969. The SUF broke away, renamed itself SUF(m-l) and launched the Workers' Communist Party (Marxist–Leninist) (which merged with the Red Electoral Alliance in 2007 to launch the new Red Party).

Following the split, Socialist People's Youth (Sosialistisk Folkepartis Ungdom) became the new SF youth wing. SF lost parliamentary representation in 1969, but in 1972 a DNA MP, Arne Kielland, joined SF.

SF was the driving force behind the formation of Socialist Electoral League, which later emerged into Socialist Left Party. SV can be seen as the direct successor of the SF.

Parliamentary election results

SF party leaders
1961-1969 : Knut Løfsnes
1969-1971 : Torolv Solheim
1971-1973 : Finn Gustavsen
1973-1975 : Stein Ørnhøi

References

1961 establishments in Norway
1976 disestablishments in Norway
Defunct political parties in Norway
Political parties established in 1961
Political parties disestablished in 1976
Socialist parties in Norway